Chang Ming-chung (born 3 January 1943) is a Taiwanese weightlifter. He competed at the 1964 Summer Olympics and the 1968 Summer Olympics.

References

1943 births
Living people
Taiwanese male weightlifters
Olympic weightlifters of Taiwan
Weightlifters at the 1964 Summer Olympics
Weightlifters at the 1968 Summer Olympics
Sportspeople from Tainan
Medalists at the 1966 Asian Games
Asian Games bronze medalists for Chinese Taipei
Weightlifters at the 1966 Asian Games
Asian Games medalists in weightlifting
20th-century Taiwanese people